Phyllonorycter penangensis is a moth of the family Gracillariidae. It is known from Penang, Malaysia.

The wingspan is 6-6.3 mm.

The larvae feed on Rubus moluccanus. They mine the leaves of their host plant. The mine has the form of a rather large, star-like mine occurring upon the upper side of the leaf. It is rather fiat, but its central area is slightly swollen in a circle. It never forms a tentiform type at maturity. The mining part of the leaf is whitish-green in the young stage and brownish in the mature stage. Pupation takes place inside the mine, usually at the swollen part. The cocoon is ellipsoidal, whitish, and covered with grains of frass.

References

penangensis
Moths of Asia
Moths described in 1993